Madagascara is a genus of flies in the family Stratiomyidae.

Distribution
Madagascar.

Species
Madagascara seyrigi Lindner, 1936
Madagascara woodleyi Schacht & Heuck, 2006

References

Stratiomyidae
Brachycera genera
Taxa named by Erwin Lindner
Diptera of Africa
Endemic fauna of Madagascar